Ramesh Unka Patel  (born 12 September 1953) is a former field hockey player from New Zealand, who was a member of the national team that won the golden medal at the 1976 Summer Olympics in Montreal.

In the 1988 New Year Honours, Patel was awarded the Queen's Service Medal for community service.

References

External links
 

New Zealand male field hockey players
Olympic field hockey players of New Zealand
Field hockey players at the 1972 Summer Olympics
Field hockey players at the 1976 Summer Olympics
Field hockey players at the 1984 Summer Olympics
Field hockey players from Auckland
New Zealand sportspeople of Indian descent
1953 births
Living people
Olympic medalists in field hockey
Medalists at the 1976 Summer Olympics
Olympic gold medalists for New Zealand
People educated at Onehunga High School